Entertainment is an event, performance, or activity designed to give pleasure to an audience.

Entertainment or Entertain may also refer to:

Film and television
 E!, formerly Entertainment Television
 Entertainment (2014 film), a 2014 Bollywood film also known as It's Entertainment
 Entertainment (2015 film), a 2015 American film
 Entertainment Today
 Entertainment Tonight
 Entertainment Tonight Canada
 RTL CBS Entertainment, a Southeast Asian TV channel simply known as "Entertainment" prior to the rebranding as Blue Ant Entertainment

Literature
 Entertain Magazine, a 2007–10 British entertainment magazine
 Entertainment Weekly, an American magazine (sometimes abbreviated as EW)

Music
 Entertainment (Fischerspooner album), 2009
 Entertainment (Waterparks album), 2018
 Entertainment (band), a post-punk band formed in 2002
 "Entertainment" (song), a 2013 song by the band Phoenix
 Entertainment!, a 1979 Gang of Four album
 "Entertainment", a track on Appeal to Reason, a 2008 album by Rise Against
 "Entertain", a track on The Woods, a 2005 album by Sleater-Kinney

Other
 entertainment.ie, an Irish entertainment website
Nintendo Entertainment System, a 1985 video game console by Nintendo.

See also
 The Entertainer (disambiguation)
 That's Entertainment (disambiguation)
 Entertainment district
 The Entertainment Quarter, Sydney, Australia
 Amusement